The following are lists of massacres that have occurred in El Salvador (numbers may be approximate).  There were some 27 separate documented civilian massacres in the Salvadoran Civil War era alone (1979–1989), in total the war directly claimed 70,000 to 80,000 lives.  Additional ongoing violence related to the massacres and their obfuscation has claimed numerous activists, religious leaders, university professors, mayors, and foreigners in the decades following the civil war until the present day.

Pre-war

Salvadoran Civil War era

References 

El Salvador
Massacres